Pathogenesis-related (PR) proteins are proteins produced in plants in the event of a pathogen attack. They are induced as part of systemic acquired resistance. Infections activate genes that produce PR proteins. Some of these proteins are antimicrobial, attacking molecules in the cell wall of a bacterium or fungus. Others may function as signals that spread “news” of the infection to nearby cells. Infections also stimulate the cross-linking of molecules in the cell wall and the deposition of lignin, responses that set up a local barricade that slows spread of the pathogen to other parts of the plant.

Salicylic acid plays a role in the resistance to pathogens by inducing the production of pathogenesis-related proteins. Many proteins found in wine are grape pathogen-related proteins. Those include thaumatin-like proteins and chitinases.

Many pathogenesis-related protein families also coincide with groups of human allergens, even though the allergy may have nothing to do with the defense function of the proteins. Grouping these proteins by their sequence features allows for finding potential allergenic proteins from sequenced plant genomes, a field of study dubbed "allergenomics".

Classification 

, 17 families of PR proteins have been named:

Identification 
As PR proteins are produced when plant tissue is stressed, various ways of stress signaling is used to "bait" the plant into expressing PR genes for identification. Useful stressors include an actual infection or simply defense signals such as salicylate and methyl jasmonate. The proteins can be identified by isolation, peptide digestion, and matching against the genomic sequences (protein sequencing). The sequences obtained can then be checked against known PR protein families for categorization.

See also
 Acibenzolar-S-methyl
 Glossary of phytopathology
 R gene, unrelated resistance proteins

References

Further reading

External links 
 WHO Allergen Nomenclature for conversion of allergens to specific sequences.
 UniProt keyword: KW-0568
 Gene ontology mapping: GO:0009607, GO:0006952

Plant proteins